Leandro Riedi (born 27 January 2002) is a Swiss tennis player. He has a career high ATP singles ranking of World No. 126 achieved on 20 March 2023. He also has a career high ATP doubles ranking of World No. 211 achieved on 6 February 2023.

Junior career
As a junior, Riedi reached as high as World No. 6 in the combined singles and doubles ITF Junior Circuit ranking system, which he attained on 12 October 2020.

Alongside Romanian partner Nicholas David Ionel he captured the 2020 Australian Open – Boys' doubles title by defeating Mikołaj Lorens and Kārlis Ozoliņš 6–7(8–10), 7–5, [10–4] in the championship match. He also reached the boys' singles final at the 2020 French Open but came up just short being defeated by compatriot Dominic Stricker 2–6, 4–6.

Professional career

2021: ATP debut
Riedi reached five finals on the ITF Men's World Tennis Tour winning three and losing two. 
In May, he won the first senior level title of his career when he won the doubles draw of the M15 Majadahonda tournament on clay courts in Spain, alongside Dominic Stricker.
In October, he claimed his first senior level title in singles winning the M15 Selva Gardena tournament on hard courts in Italy.

Riedi made his ATP debut at the 2021 Swiss Open Gstaad receiving a wildcard in both the singles draw and the doubles draw partnering with Jakub Paul. He lost the singles in the first round against Federico Delbonis in straight sets. He won his maiden doubles match against Evan King and Max Schnur.

2022: Maiden Challenger title, Top 200 debut in singles & top 250 in doubles
In March, he reached his first singles and doubles finals on the ATP Challenger Tour both at the 2022 Challenger Città di Lugano, Switzerland. He also received wildcard for the 2022 Geneva Open for the singles and doubles partnering again with Jakub Paul. The pair reached the quarterfinals defeating second seeds Jamie Murray and Bruno Soares.
In the same month, he also won the M25 tournament in Trimbach, Switzerland and in May another M25 in Notthingham, United Kingdom.

In October, in doubles he won the Challenger tournament at Tiburon, CA, United States, alongside Valentin Vacherot.
In November, he won the 2022 HPP Open Challenger in Helsinki as a qualifier defeating Dimitar Kuzmanov and Jelle Sels, moving 80 positions up in the rankings, finishing the year in the top 200 at No. 197 on 21 November 2022. A week earlier, he also reached the top 250 in doubles. The following week he won his next Challenger singles title in Andria, Italy moving another 36 positions to No. 161 on 28 November 2022.

2023: First ATP win, Masters 1000 & Top 125 debut
He reached the top 150 on 9 January 2023 at world No. 135 following a final showing at the Challenger in Canberra, Australia.

At the 2023 Open 13 Provence in Marseille, he recorded his first ATP win against Arthur Rinderknech. He lost to eventual champion Hubert Hurkacz.

He made his Masters 1000 main draw debut in Indian Wells as a qualifier where he lost to Jack Draper (tennis).

ATP Challenger and ITF World Tennis Tour finals

Singles: 8 (5–3)

Doubles: 11 (6–5)

Junior Grand Slam finals

Singles: 1 (1 runner-up)

Doubles: 1 (1 title)

References

External links
 
 

2002 births
Living people
Swiss male tennis players
Australian Open (tennis) junior champions
Grand Slam (tennis) champions in boys' doubles
Sportspeople from Thurgau